Funk This is an album from New Orleans funk group George Porter Jr. and Running Pardners.

Track listing
All tracks composed by George Porter Jr. except where indicated
"Timekeeper" 
"Sweetness" (Brint Anderson)
"Bone Funk" (Eddie Tebbe, G. Porter Jr.)
"Mam Didn't Raise No Fool" (B. McDonald, G. Porter Jr.)
"Mo' 2 Come"

Personnel

Brint Anderson – Guitar and Vocals
Jeffrey Alexander – Drums and Vocals
John Gros – Keyboards
Tracy Griffin – Trumpet
Mark Mullins – Trombone
Brian Graber – Tenor and Soparano sax

2000 albums
Funk albums by American artists